A Mars Muffin is a baked goods item produced by McVitie's and marketed in the United Kingdom. It is a muffin covered in Mars Bar style chocolate, partly filled with caramel, with caramel flavour cake.

Food products